The 126th Baluchistan Infantry was an infantry regiment of the British Indian Army raised in 1825 as the 2nd Extra Battalion of Bombay Native Infantry. It was designated as the 126th Baluchistan Infantry in 1903 and became 2nd Battalion 10th Baluch Regiment in 1922. In 1947, it was allocated to the Pakistan Army, where it continues to exist as 7th Battalion of The Baloch Regiment.

Early history
The regiment was raised in 1825 at Bombay as the 2nd Extra Battalion of Bombay Native Infantry. In 1826, it was designated as the 26th Regiment of Bombay Native Infantry. In 1856, it was dispatched to Persia, where it took part in the Battle of Kooshab during the Anglo-Persian War of 1856-57.  In 1891,  the regiment was localized to the Province of Baluchistan and reconstituted with Balochis, Brahuis, Pathans and Punjabi Muslims. It adopted uniforms of drab colour with red trousers and its designation was changed to 26th (Baluchistan) Regiment of Bombay Infantry. In 1900 it was sent to China to suppress the Boxer Rebellion. In 1901, the regiment's designation was changed to 26th Baluchistan Infantry.

126th Baluchistan Infantry
Subsequent to the reforms brought about in the Indian Army by Lord Kitchener in 1903, all former Bombay Army units had 100 added to their numbers. Consequently, the regiment's designation was changed to 126th Baluchistan Infantry and it was delocalized from Baluchistan. On the outbreak of the First World War, the regiment was sent to Aden, where it remained during the war except for brief stays in Egypt in 1915 and Mesopotamia in 1917.

Subsequent History
In 1922, the regiment was grouped with five other Baluch battalions: 1st & 2nd Battalions of 124th Duchess of Connaught's Own Baluchistan Infantry, 127th Queen Mary's Own Baluch Light Infantry, 129th Duke of Connaught's Own Baluchis and the 130th King George's Own Baluchis (Jacob's Rifles), to form the 10th Baluch Regiment. The 126th Baluchistan Infantry was redesignated as the 2nd Battalion of the new regiment. During the Second World War, 2/10th Baluch fought with great gallantry in the Malayan Campaign. The battalion was taken prisoner by the Japanese on Singapore Island after the surrender of British forces on 15 February 1942. It suffered a total of 1596 casualties in the war and during the Japanese captivity. The battalion won distinction for resisting intense enemy pressure to join the Japanese-sponsored Indian National Army. Prominent among them was Lieutenant Abrar Hussain, who was awarded the MBE for his heroic conduct whilst a Prisoner of War. On its return from captivity, the battalion was reformed in 1946. On the independence of Pakistan in 1947, the Baluch Regiment was allocated to Pakistan Army. In 1956, on the merger of 8th Punjab and Bahawalpur Regiments with the Baluch Regiment, 2 Baluch was redesignated as 7 Baluch (now 7 Baloch). During the Indo-Pakistan War of 1965, the battalion fought with distinction in the Kasur Sector.

Genealogy
1825 - 2nd Extra Battalion of Bombay Native Infantry 
1826 - 26th Regiment of Bombay Native Infantry 
1885 - 26th Regiment of Bombay Infantry
1892 - 26th (Baluchistan) Regiment of Bombay Infantry
1901 - 26th Baluchistan Infantry
1903 - 126th Baluchistan Infantry 
1922 - 2nd Battalion 10th Baluch Regiment or 2/10th Baluch
1945 - 2nd Battalion The Baluch Regiment or 2 Baluch
1956 - 7th Battalion The Baluch Regiment or 7 Baluch
1991 - 7th Battalion The Baloch Regiment or 7 Baloch

References

Further reading
 Ahmad, Lt Col Rifat Nadeem. (2010). Battle Honours of the Baloch Regiment. Abbottabad: The Baloch Regimental Centre.
 Ahmed, Maj Gen Rafiuddin. (1998). History of the Baloch Regiment 1820-1939. Abbottabad: The Baloch Regimental Centre. 
 Ahmed, Maj Gen Rafiuddin. (2000). History of the Baloch Regiment 1939-1956. Abbottabad: The Baloch Regimental Centre. 
 Barthorp, Michael, & Jeffrey Burn. (1979). Indian Infantry Regiments 1860–1914. Osprey Publishing. 
 Cadell, Sir Patrick. (1938). History of the Bombay Army. London: Longmans & Green
Gaylor, John (1992). Sons of John Company: Indian and Pakistan Armies, 1903-1991, Spellmount Publishers Ltd. .

External links
History of the Baloch Regiment 1820–1939 the Colonial Period, text of pages 1 to 15 available online as download preview

See also
10th Baluch Regiment
The Baloch Regiment
Major General Abrar Hussain, HJ, MBE

Baloch Regiment
British Indian Army infantry regiments
Military units and formations established in 1903
Military units and formations disestablished in 1922
Military units and formations of the Boxer Rebellion
Indian World War I regiments